The Collums-Baker House is a historic house on the east side of United States Route 65, about  south of Bee Branch, Arkansas.  It is a -story wood-frame structure, with an irregular roof line and massing, set on a block foundation.  Its main block has a roof that is gabled on one end, with gable-on-hip on the other, and a lower hip-roofed section to the right, with a single-story hip-roofed ell extending further to the right.  A single-story hip-roof porch extends across the main section, featuring turned posts and decorative brackets.  

Built in 1907, it is the best local example of the Folk Victorian style. The house shares characteristics with the Art Scanlan House, suggesting both may have the same builder.

The house was listed on the National Register of Historic Places in 1992.

See also
National Register of Historic Places listings in Van Buren County, Arkansas

References

Houses on the National Register of Historic Places in Arkansas
Victorian architecture in Arkansas
Houses completed in 1907
National Register of Historic Places in Van Buren County, Arkansas
1907 establishments in Arkansas
Folk Victorian architecture in the United States
Houses in Van Buren County, Arkansas